Revolución  is a station on Line 2 of the Mexico City Metro system. It is located in the Colonia Tabacalera and Colonia Buenavista districts in the Cuauhtémoc borough of Mexico City, northwest of the city centre, on Avenida México - Tenochtitlan. It was first opened to the public on 14 September 1970.

General information
The station logo and name come from the nearby Monumento a la Revolución, which opened in 1938.

The station is also near Avenida de los Insurgentes, one of the city's most important thoroughfares. The Insurgentes Metrobús bus rapid transit line has a stop in the vicinity of Revolución.

Ridership

Nearby
Monumento a la Revolución, monument commemorating the Mexican Revolution.
Museo Nacional de San Carlos, art museum devoted to European art.

Exits
South: México - Tenochtitlan street, Colonia Tabacalera
Northeast: México - Tenochtitlan street and  B. de Sahagún street, Colonia Buenavista
Northwest: México - Tenochtitlan street, Colonia Buenavista

See also 
 List of Mexico City metro stations

References

External links 

Revolucion
Railway stations opened in 1970
1970 establishments in Mexico
Mexico City Metro stations in Cuauhtémoc, Mexico City
Accessible Mexico City Metro stations